The 1987–88 Bulgarian Hockey League season was the 36th season of the Bulgarian Hockey League, the top level of ice hockey in Bulgaria. Five teams participated in the league, and HK Slavia Sofia won the championship.

Regular season

Final 
 HK Slavia Sofia - HK CSKA Sofia 2:4/6:1

External links
 Season on hockeyarchives.info

Bulgarian Hockey League seasons
Bul
Bulg